David Rasmussen Hansen (born March 16, 1938) is a Senior United States circuit judge of the United States Court of Appeals for the Eighth Circuit and a former United States District Judge of the United States District Court for the Northern District of Iowa.

Early life, education
Born in Exira, Iowa, Hansen received a Bachelor of Arts degree from Northwest Missouri State University, in 1960 and a Juris Doctor from George Washington University Law School, in 1963.

Career
He was in private practice in Atlantic, Iowa, from 1963 to 1964. He attended The JAG School at the University of Virginia and entered U.S. Army JAG Corps from 1964 until 1968. He was in private practice in Iowa Falls, Iowa, from 1968 to 1976.

Judicial career
He was a judge on the police court, Iowa Falls, from 1969 to 1973, and was a partner in Win-Gin Farms, in Iowa Falls, Iowa, from 1971 to the present. He was chairman, Hardin county Republican central committee, from 1975 to 1976. He was a judge on the 2nd judicial district, Iowa district court, from 1976 to 1986.

Hansen was a United States district judge of the United States District Court for the Northern District of Iowa. He was nominated by President Ronald Reagan, on February 3, 1986, to a seat vacated by Edward Joseph McManus. He was confirmed by the United States Senate, on March 3, 1986, and received his commission on March 4, 1986. Hansen served in that capacity until November 18, 1991, when he was elevated to the Eighth Circuit.

Nomination to the Eighth Circuit
Hansen is a United States Circuit Judge of the United States Court of Appeals for the Eighth Circuit. He was nominated by President George H. W. Bush, on July 30, 1991, to a new seat created by 104 Stat. 5089. He was confirmed by the United States Senate, on November 15, 1991, and received his commission on November 18, 1991. He served as Chief Judge, from 2002 to 2003. He assumed senior status on April 1, 2003.

References

Sources

1938 births
Living people
20th-century American judges
George Washington University Law School alumni
Iowa state court judges
Judges of the United States Court of Appeals for the Eighth Circuit
Judges of the United States District Court for the Northern District of Iowa
Iowa Republicans
Northwest Missouri State University alumni
People from Audubon County, Iowa
United States Army officers
United States court of appeals judges appointed by George H. W. Bush
United States district court judges appointed by Ronald Reagan